Dmitri Vladimirovich Khromin (born October 21, 1982 in Leningrad, Russian SFSR) is a figure skating coach and former Russian-Polish pair skater. He competes with Dominika Piątkowska. The pair are the 2005-2007 Polish national champions (Dorota Zagorska and Mariusz Siudek did not compete those years).

He previously competed with Julia Shapiro for Russia and had some success on the Junior Grand Prix circuit. The pair broke up in  2002.

Since 2020 Khromin has been working as a coach at the Tamara Moskvina figure skating club in the group of Veronika Daineko. He previously worked as a coach in Novosibirsk. His former student Vsevolod Knyazev is now training with Eteri Tutberidze. He won gold of the stage of the Russian Cup among juniors in 2019 and silver in 2020.

Competitive highlights

With Piatkowska for Poland

With Shapiro for Russia

External links

 
 

Living people
Russian male pair skaters
Polish male pair skaters
Russian emigrants to Poland
Naturalized citizens of Poland
1982 births
Figure skaters from Saint Petersburg